Fudbalski klub Napredak Kruševac, commonly known as Napredak Kruševac, is a Serbian professional football club based in the city of Kruševac. The word Napredak means "progress" in Serbian.

The club's nickname is the Čarapani which translates in English to the sock-men, the origin of this nickname are from the times of the First Serbian Uprising, when the local insurgents took off their slippers and silently went to defend their homeland against the Ottoman occupation of Serbia, in socks. Another interpretation is related to the custom of men in this area who in urban legend in medieval times wore beautiful, long embroidered socks.

History
Napredak was founded on 8 December 1946, through a merger of three local area clubs Zakić, Badža and 14. Oktobar. In January 1947, they played its first official game against Vardar, the result was 1–1. The first goal in Napredak's history scored Marko Valok, who became later a famous player of Partizan Belgrade and Yugoslavian First League top scorer in 1950. In 1949, they became champions of Serbia, the first title of the club. In 1951, Napredak joined the Yugoslav First League for the first time, but they immediately relegated in the IV Zona (IV Zone), which was one of the 5 subdivisions of the Yugoslav Second League. Since the season 1958/59, they compete in the new format of the Yugoslav Second League.

In 1976, led by coach Dragan Bojović, the club won the second league and again provides a placement in the elite, thanks to the four goals by Jovica Škoro, three by Milomir Jakovljević and one by Dragiša Ćuslović, which brought the decisive 8–2 victory over Rad Belgrade, but they relegated again in the same season. In the season 1978–79, they joined the Yugoslav First League, and in that season, Yugoslav powerhouse Partizan suffered a sensational 3–0 home defeat from Napredak. In the season 1979–80, led by coach Tomislav Kaloperović, Napredak finished the championship as 4th and this in front of several Yugoslav top clubs, and qualified finally for the first time for a European competition, the 1980–81 UEFA Cup season, but they were eliminated already in the first round by Eastern Germany's club Dynamo Dresden. It got even worse, because in the same season the club finished the league unexpectedly in the last place and relegated to the Yugoslav Second League and competed there until 1988. In the season 1987–88, Napredak won the East Division of the second league and was promoted to the top tier, but the club could not keep in the first league and relegated for the third time in its history again in the debut season. Napredak remain in the second league until the season 1991–92, the last season of the Socialist Federal Republic of Yugoslavia, and was one of the clubs, which were member of the newly founded First League of the Federal Republic of Yugoslavia. In 1993, Napredak achieved a good six place, but the subsequent 1993–94 season, they relegated to the second league.

New Millennium (2000–2010)
They was during the nineties on the border between the first and second league and won finally in the season 1999–2000 the group East of the Yugoslav Second League and returned to the top tier. In the same season, Napredak's achieved its biggest success in a domestic competition, the reaching of the Yugoslav Cup final in 2000, but lost against the Serbian giant Red Star Belgrade. Their presence in the national cup final earned them a spot for the 2000–01 UEFA Cup season. This time, the team had a little more success than the first participation, eliminating Estonia's Viljandi Tulevik in the first round, but getting eliminated in the second by Greek club OFI Crete. The first league debut for the season 2000–01 was again, after the club history almost traditional, not a successful season and they relegated again immediately. The club received slowly the reputation to be an elevator team due to the frequent promotions and subsequent relegations. In 2003, Federal Republic of Yugoslavia was renamed to Serbia and Montenegro and the football leagues followed the renaming. In 2003, Napredak won the group East of the Second League of Serbia and Montenegro and promoted to the 2003–04 First League of Serbia and Montenegro season, but relegated again immediately, and this already in total for the fifth time in its history immediately after a promotion.

After Montenegrin independence in 2006, the clubs from Montenegro withdrew from the league and since then the leagues formed by clubs from the territory of Serbia only. In the season 2006–07, Napredak achieved the third place of the Serbian First League, the second tier in the Serbian football system. Then provided the first two places the promotion in the first league, but on 19 July, in 2007, the Football Association of Serbia decided that Napredak will be promoted to the Serbian SuperLiga and replace Mladost Apatin who withdrew from the competition after being unable to bear the financial burden of playing in a top division. In 2008, they missed barely a qualification place for the 2008–09 UEFA Cup. However, two years later, precisely in 2010, Napredak relegated and played again in the Serbian First League.

New Management (2011–present)

Napredak began transforming from the beginning of 2012 with the arrival of new management and players alike. One of the players was striker Nenad Mirosavljević, one of the best known player in the Serbian football and one of the greatest players to have ever played for APOEL, who was signed from Olympiakos Nicosia. Less than a month after his signing, the club brought the new director Goran Karić, who had the task of bringing the club back to the top flight from the Serbian First League.

Napredak occupied after the first half of the season the bottom half of table, but the new team started a series of victories and they finished the 2011–12 Serbian First League season as 6th, barely missing promotion to the first-tier, the Serbian SuperLiga. On 17 September 2012, Karić was replaced by new director Vladimir Arsić. One of the first acts under the new management was the redesign of the club's logo. The renovation of Napredak's home ground, the Madost Stadium, was complete by the end of April 2012, and the club was able to play again at home. On 9 December, in 2012, Napredak celebrated its 66th birthday and the club's position at first place at the end of the first half of the 2012–13 Serbian First League, which was practically an unprecedented success for the club. Napredak finally promoted to Serbian SuperLiga after crowning First League as champions. Napredak finished SuperLiga as 9th in 2013–14 season. But, Napredak finished it as 14th in 2014–15 season and played play-out against Metalac, 3rd of Serbian First League. After a 3–1 loss away on 30 May 2015 and a 1–1 draw at home on 3 June 2015, Napredak were relegated to second tier.

Club colors and crest
Throughout its history Napredak has traditionally performed in the color red as a tribute to the Labour movement, but the club used also as away kit, an all-white jersey. The crest includes the colors red and white, as well as the year 1946 marking the year the club was established, a football in the middle and the top symbolizes the wall of the Kruševac Fortress, which is believed to have been built by Serbian medieval ruler, Tsar Lazar.

Stadium

The home field of Napredak is the Mladost Stadium, an all-seater football stadium, which has capacity for 10,331 people. The ground was built in 1976, in a record time of just 60 days, with initial capacity being of 25,000. it is one of the few single-purpose stadiums in Serbia, because it lacks a track ring like in conventional multi-purpose stadiums, noise from the spectators is closer to the field and therefore composes a louder and exciting atmosphere for hosting and visiting teams alike. In 2012 Napredak carried out an extensive renovation project, installing seats throughout the stadium and erecting four floodlight masts. That year the stadium hosted the 2012 Serbian Cup Final and is also one of the venues for the Serbian national under-21 football team.

Supporters
The organized supporters group of Napredak are known as Jakuza, which was formed in 1988. They are in a brotherhood with the organized supporter group of Mačva Šabac, the Šaneri.
People from Kruševac and district are supporting Napredak and all, are known as Čarapani.
Song name "Svake noći tebe sanjam".
Chant "Samo napred Čarapani!".

Honours

Domestic

League
Yugoslav Second League
Winners (4): 1957–58 , 1975−76 , 1977−78 , 1987–88 
Second League of Serbia and Montenegro
Winners (2): 1999–2000, 2002–03
Second League of Serbia and Montenegro
Winners (2): 2012–13, 2015–16

Cups
Serbia and Montenegro Cup
Runners-up (1): 1999–2000

Recent league history

European record
1R = First round, PR = Preliminary round, QR = Qualifying round, PO = play-off round.

Players

Current squad

Out on loan

Players with multiple nationalities

Club officials
{| class="wikitable"
|-  style="text-align:center;background:#FF0000; color:black; border-top:black 3px solid; border-bottom:black 3px solid;"
| COLSPAN="14" | <span style="color:white;">Current technical staff</span>
|-  style="text-align:center; background:#ddffdd;"
!Position
!Name
|-
|-
|Manager||  Dušan Đorđević
|-
|Assistant coach||  Despot Višković
|-
|Fitness Coach||  Miloš Lukić
|-
|Goalkeeper coach||  Saša Bakuš
|-
|Club doctor|| Nikola Kljajić
|-
|Physiotherapist|| Svetomir Tomić
|-
|Physiotherapist|| Saša Miletić
|-
|Director of football||  Bojan Filipović
|-
|General secretary||  Zoran Ristić
|-
|Economic||  Saša Miladinović
|-
|Economic||  Veroljub Lazarević
|-
| colspan="2" | Source':
|}

Notable former players
List of former players with senior national team appearances:

Domestic:
 Dragiša Binić
 Vladimir Dišljenković
 Vladimir Durković
 Vladislav Đukić
 Marko Gobeljić
 Bratislav Punoševac
 Ivan Gvozdenović
 Ešef Jašarević
 Branislav Jovanović
 Radivoje Manić
 Jovan Markoski
  Zoran Martinović
 Dušan Petronijević
 Dušan Pešić
  Nebojša Rudić
 Zoran Simović
 Milijan Tupajić
 Marko Valok
 Bojan Zajić
 Miloš Vulić
 Aleksa Vukanović

Foreign:
 Daur Kvekveskiri
 Ognjen Vranješ
 Yaw Antwi
 Dejan Antonić
 Stefan Aškovski
 Vlade Lazarevski
 Vladimir Jovović
 Filip Kasalica
 Marko Simeunovič
 Ibrahima N'DiayeFor the list of all current and former players with Wikipedia article, please see :Category:FK Napredak Kruševac players.''

Former managers
This is a list of former managers of Napredak Kruševac:

 Boško Ralić 1958 – 1959
 Dragan Bojović 1975 – 1976
 Vladica Popović 1976 – 1977
 Srećko Petković 1978 – 1979
 Dragoljub Milošević 1978 – 1979
 Vladimir Milosavljević 1978 – 1979
 Tomislav Kaloperović 07/1979 – 06/1980
 Milenko Mihić 1980 – 1981
 Slobodan Dogandžić 1993 – 1994
 Vladimir Milosavljević 1994 – 1995
 Mikica Gošić 1999
 Vladislav Đukić 2000
 Miroslav Ivković & Zvonko Petrović 2001 – 2002
 Saša Nikolić & Mladen Dodić 07/2007 – 06/2008
 Jovica Škoro 07/2008 – 12/2008
 Nenad Sakić 12/2008 – 11/2009
 Jovica Škoro 12/2009 – 06/2010
 Borislav Zogović (interim)
 Dragan Antić 09/2010 – 05/2011
 Borislav Zogović 2011
 Mladen Dodić 09/2011 – 12/2011
 Aleksandar Kristić 01/2012 – 05/2012
 Nenad Milovanović 06/2012 – 06/2013
 Milan Lešnjak 07/2013 – 09/2013
 Nenad Milovanović 09/2013 – 01/2014
 Nenad Lalatović 01/2014 – 06/2014
 Siniša Gogić 06/2014 – 08/2014
 Saša Štrbac 09/2014 – 01/2015
 Branko Smiljanić 2013/2014 – 2014
 Slavko Matić 01/2014 – 06/2015
 Ljubiša Stamenković (interim)
 Bogić Bogićević 07/2015 – 06/2016
 Dragan Ivanović 06/2016 – 12/2016
 Vuk Rašović  01/2017 – 06/2017
 Nenad Sakić 06/2017 – 09-2017
 Milorad Kosanović 09/2017 – 06-2019
 Predrag Rogan 06/2019 – 12/2019
 Ivan Stefanović 12/2019 – 03/2020
 Dragan Ivanović 03/2020 –

Kit manufacturers and shirt sponsors

References

External links

  
 Club page at srbijasport.net

 
Football clubs in Serbia
Football clubs in Yugoslavia
Association football clubs established in 1946
1946 establishments in Serbia
Sport in Kruševac